Aguila is an unincorporated community and census-designated place (CDP) in Maricopa County, Arizona, United States. Major economic activities include cantaloupe farming and formerly included mining. It uses the same street numbering system as Phoenix. As of the 2020 census, the population of Aguila was 565, down from 798 in 2010.

Demographics 

Aguila first appeared on the 1920 U.S. Census as the 52nd Precinct of Maricopa County. In 1930, it simply appeared as the Aguila Precinct. It was recorded as having a Spanish/Hispanic majority for that census (the census would not separately feature that racial demographic again until 1980). Aguila's population was 40 in 1940,'s population was 25 in 1940. and 120 in the 1960 census. 

In 2010, it was made a census-designated place (CDP).

As of the census of 2010, there were 798 people living in Aguila. The population density was 508.1 people per square mile. The racial makeup was 64.7% White, 1.0% Black or African American, 3.6% Native American, 0.4% Asian, 0.3% Pacific Islander, 28.1% from other races, and 2.0% from two or more races. 69.4% of the population were Hispanic or Latino of any race.

Climate 
This area has a large amount of sunshine year round due to its stable descending air and high pressure.  According to the Köppen Climate Classification system, Aguila has a desert climate, abbreviated "Bwh" on climate maps.

References 

Census-designated places in Maricopa County, Arizona